"Way Over There" is a 1960 Motown soul song and single, written by William "Smokey" Robinson, produced by Berry Gordy, and first performed by The Miracles (credited as "The Miracles featuring Bill 'Smokey' Robinson") for the Tamla (Motown) label. It was one of The Miracles' earliest charting singles, reaching #94 on the Billboard Pop chart. Motown president Berry Gordy, Jr. had The Miracles record the song several times during its chart run. The first version had minimal orchestration. The second version added strings, and this is the version played by most oldies stations today. Claudette (Mrs. Smokey) Robinson had several lead parts on this song (as the "lover way over there on the mountainside"), answering Smokey's leads with chants of "Come to me, Baby". The song's B-side, "(You Can) Depend on Me", while not charting nationally, did become a popular regional hit in many areas of the country, and Smokey still sings it in his live shows today.
"Way Over There" has inspired cover versions by Edwin Starr, The Temptations, The Marvelettes, The Royal Counts, The Spitballs, and Eddie Adams Jr, while "(You Can) Depend on Me" has inspired cover versions by The Temptations, The Supremes, Mary Wells, and Brenda Holloway.  The song was also used for the title of Hip-O Select's 2009 compilation: The Miracles – Depend on Me: The Early Albums , which collects the first five LP releases by the group.

Personnel

The Miracles

Smokey Robinson & Claudette Robinson – Lead vocals
Bobby Rogers – Background vocals
Pete Moore – Background vocals
Claudette Robinson – Background vocals
Ronnie White – Background vocals
Marv Tarplin – Guitar

Additional instruments
The Funk Brothers
The Detroit Symphony Orchestra (later version)
Various Chicago area musicians (later version)

References

External links
"Way Over There" by The Miracles
"Way Over There" song review from the "Motown Junkies" website

1960 singles
1962 singles
Tamla Records singles
The Miracles songs
The Temptations songs
The Marvelettes songs
Songs written by Smokey Robinson
Songs written by Berry Gordy
Edwin Starr songs
Song recordings produced by Berry Gordy
1960 songs